The Debtors Act 1869 (32 & 33 Vict. c. 62) was an Act of the Parliament of the United Kingdom of Great Britain and Ireland that aimed to reform the powers of courts to detain debtors.

Detail
In England, debtors owing money could be easily detained by the courts for indefinite periods, being kept in debtor's prisons.  Approximately 10,000 people were imprisoned for debt each year during the nineteenth century.  However, a prison term did not alleviate a person’s debt; typically, it was required that the creditor be repaid in-full before an inmate was released.  Acts of parliament in 1831 and 1861 had begun the process of reform in this area, but further reform was felt necessary.  Among the advocates for debtor's reform was Charles Dickens, who, at the age of 12, saw his father sentenced to debtors' prison. Dickens’ novel Little Dorrit  was written to encourage debt reform and was set in the Marshalsea debtors' prison where his father was incarcerated.

In Victorian England, the concepts of credit and debt were closely linked to that of a person’s character. Credit was not only determined based on a person’s assets and income, but also their social status within the community and their adherence to the moral standards of the time. Going into debt was seen as a moral failure, not merely an economic circumstance, and it was punished accordingly. This system typically favoured the upper classes.  It was more difficult for the working classes to obtain credit; and if they went into debt, the penalties they incurred were more severe than those issued to the upper classes. County Court judges, who presided over debt and bankruptcy cases, often issued rulings based on the belief that the working classes defaulted on their debts deliberately.  In contrast, the upper classes were seen as having an honest desire to repay their debt and were given more lenient treatment.

Declaring bankruptcy allowed a debtor to avoid prison, but this was not an option available to everyone. Until 1861 it was limited to the merchant class.  Furthermore, the cost of filing for bankruptcy was 10 pounds,  which represented 10-20% of the average annual income for the common worker in the mid-1860s.

The Debtors Act 1869 significantly reduced the ability of the courts to detain those in debt, although some provisions were retained. Debtors who had the means to repay their creditors but refused to do so could still be imprisoned, as could those who defaulted on payments to the court. Further reform followed through the Bankruptcy Act 1883. These Acts initially reduced the number of debtors sentenced to prison, but by the early twentieth century, the annual number had risen to 11,427, an increase of nearly 2,000 from 1869.

Much of the Act has been repealed, but some provisions, such as section 5 relating to the judgment summons procedure, survive.

See also
UK insolvency law

Notes

References
 Omar, Paul J. (ed) (2008) International insolvency law: themes and perspectives. London: Ashgate. .
 Rajak, Harry. (2008) "The culture of bankruptcy," in Omar (ed) (2008).
 

United Kingdom Acts of Parliament 1869